(+)-Cubenene synthase (EC 4.2.3.63) is an enzyme with systematic name (2E,6E)-farnesyl-diphosphate diphosphate-lyase ((+)-cubenene-forming). This enzyme catalyses the following chemical reaction

 (2E,6E)-farnesyl diphosphate  (+)-cubenene + diphosphate

This enzyme requires presence of Mg2+.

References

External links 
 

EC 4.2.3